Watco Companies, L.L.C. (Watco) is a transportation company based in Pittsburg, Kansas, formed in 1983 by Charles R. Webb. Watco was composed of four divisions: transportation, mechanical, terminal and port services, and compliance. Watco is the owner of Watco Transportation Services, L.L.C. (WTS), which operates 41 short line railroads in the U.S. and Australia. It is one of the largest short line railroad companies in the United States. Also under transportation is the contract switching the company provides service for 30 customers. That was the service that Watco originally offered before it branched out into other areas.

Watco's mechanical division has 19 car repair shops and is one of the largest mechanical services provider in the United States. They provide program, contract and emergency repairs. These services include maintenance of all types of cars including tank cars and coal fleets, and the preparation and cleaning of boxcars.

The terminal and port services division operates ten warehouses throughout the country. They also operate several transloading facilities and specialize in loading and unloading railcars and moving commodities to their next destination.

Watco operated two port services in the Gulf Region. Greens Port Terminal on the Houston Ship Channel in Harris County, Texas and Port Birmingham Terminal on the Black Warrior River in Alabama both provide access to the Gulf of Mexico.

Watco's newest division, Watco Supply Chain Services, provides supply chain logistics for highway, intermodal, rail, and international logistics.

History

Watco was established in 1983 by Charles R. "Dick" Webb. The first operation was an industrial switching operation in DeRidder, Louisiana that is still in existence. Webb then started his first mechanical operation, a railcar repair shop in Coffeyville, Kansas in 1985.

The Coffeyville mechanical shop was held captive to the major rail lines, and during discussions with the Union Pacific the opportunity arose to purchase the line running from Nevada, Missouri, to Coffeyville. This was the Union Pacific's first short line sale. Watco then looked to the West Region, acquiring the Blue Mountain Railroad in 1998, the Palouse River and Coulee City Railroad in 1992 and the Eastern Idaho Railroad in 1993.

In 1998, it began operating the Stillwater Central Railroad in Oklahoma and the Timber Rock Railroad in Texas. The Kansas & Oklahoma Railroad was acquired in 2001 and the Pennsylvania Southwestern Railroad in 2003. In 2004, they started operations of the Great Northwest Railroad in Washington, the Kaw River in Kansas and Missouri, and the Mission Mountain Railroad in Montana. In 2005 it began operating the Alabama Southern Railroad, the Louisiana Southern Railroad, the Mississippi Southern Railroad, and the Yellowstone Valley Railroad in Montana. The Austin Western Railroad was started in 2007 and shares rail with passenger rail. It also acquired Millennium Rail, a mechanical service company in 2007. The Baton Rouge Southern and the Pacific Sun Railroad were started in 2008, and they also acquired the mechanical services company Fitzgerald Railcar Services and Reload, a 25-year experienced transloading business. The Grand Elk Railroad began operations in 2009.

In December 2010 Watco entered the Australian rail haulage market when it was awarded a 10-year contract to operate grain services for the CBH Group of Western Australia. Operations commenced in March 2012.  In late 2016 Watco Australia was awarded an infrastructure train contract with Brookfield Rail operating ballast and rail work trains.

On December 15, 2010, Kinder Morgan Energy Partners, announced an agreement whereby it would invest up to $150 million over the next year in Watco in exchange for a preferred equity position in the company. Kinder Morgan made an initial $50 million preferred shares investment on January 3, 2011. Additional $50 million equity investment completed in December 2011. Kinder Morgan will receive 3.25% quarterly distribution on the equity investment. Kinder Morgan is a leading pipeline transportation and energy storage company in North America. The transaction provides capital to Watco for further expansion of specific projects and offers Kinder Morgan the opportunity to share in the subsequent growth.

In April 2011, Watco began operating the Autauga Northern Railroad, between Maplesville and Autauga Creek, Alabama, the third short line in Alabama operated by Watco.

On December 28, 2011, Watco began operations of the Swan Ranch Railroad in the Swan Ranch Industrial Park in Cheyenne, Wyoming. On January 1, 2012, Watco gained majority ownership of the Wisconsin & Southern Railroad, a regional railroad in Wisconsin, and on February 1, 2012, took over operations of the Birmingham Southern Railroad.

On June 4, 2014, Watco and The Greenbrier Companies announced that it would create an equally owned joint venture, GBW Railcar Services, providing railcar repair services. This joint venture was dissolved in August 2018.

In July 2018, Dan Smith was named Watco's new CEO.

On March 30, 2021, Watco and Canadian National subsidiary Wisconsin Central reached a deal whereby WCL would sell roughly 900 miles of non-core rail lines located in Michigan, Wisconsin, and Ontario to Watco.

In August 2021, Watco lost the contract to operate grain trains for CBH Group to Aurizon.

Holdings

References

External links

 
United States railroad holding companies
Privately held companies based in Kansas
American companies established in 1983
Holding companies established in 1983
Railway companies established in 1983
1983 establishments in Kansas
Kinder Morgan
Pittsburg, Kansas